Promontor utcai Stadion is a football stadium in Budapest, Hungary. The stadium is home to the association football side Budafoki MTE. The stadium has a capacity of 1,200.

Transport
The stadium is located in Budafok, the 22nd district of Budapest, Hungary. The stadium can be easily reached by public transport via bus.

References

External links 
Magyarfutball.hu 

Football venues in Hungary